Candi Plaosan, also known as the 'Plaosan Complex', is one of the Buddhist temples located in Bugisan village, Prambanan district, Klaten Regency, Central Java, Indonesia, about  to the northeast of the renowned Hindu Prambanan Temple.

Candi Plaosan is surrounded by paddy fields along with vegetation such as banana and corn.

Historical background

Plaosan temple was built in the mid 9th century by Sri Kahulunnan or Pramodhawardhani, the daughter of Samaratungga, descendant of Sailendra Dynasty, and who was married to Rakai Pikatan in the Hindu tradition.

The Plaosan complex currently comprises two Buddhist temples, Plaosan Lor and Plaosan Kidul 

The inscriptions and images of Plaosan Lor and Kalasan have raised questions about the origins of complex and the relationships between the images found and the religious complexity of the area when the structures were created.

The temples are separated by a road; Plaosan Lor is located in the North and Plaosan Kidul in the South. Plaosan Lor consists of two main temples and an open area known as a mandapa. Both temples have an entrance, a gate, and the guardian statue known as Dwarapala.  Plaosan Lor and Plaosan Kidul are considered to originally be one complex.

Architecture

The Plaosan temple complex is made up of 174 small buildings, 116 are stupas and 58 are shrines. Many of the buildings have inscriptions.  Two of these inscriptions denote the temple as a gift of sanctuary by Rakai Pikatan.  The dates of the inscriptions are between 825-850 AD.  Although similar to the Prambanan 856 AD date, the complexes are not related.  A new building technique distinguishes Prambanan from Plaosan temples.

The main temples at Plaosan are made up of an upper and lower level, separated in three rooms. In the lower level, multiple statues resided. Today, only two statues of Bodhisattva seated on each sides of each rooms, flanked an empty pedestal. However, as the position of the false windows dictate, there was only one statue rested on the bottom basal level on central pedestal. This statue today is missing, it was probably some bronze statues depicting Buddha with two stone Bodhisattva statues flanked it. Historians suggests that a main temple once contains nine statues, six stone Bodhisattvas, and three bronze Buddhas (now missing). This means there was 18 statues resided in the twin main temples.

On the upper walls in each rooms, there are the traces of stones indentions that once supported wooden beams and wooden floors, creating upper rooms. There is also traces of stones as the base of wooden stairs.

Rows of exquisite carvings of Bodhisattvas divinities are found adorning the outer walls, with the majority of them being male. Smaller and less occurring carvings by the windows represent female figures.

One exceptional example is carved on inner wall of the room depicting a representation of a Khmer prince which is identified by his crown.

2000s era 

In 2006 an earthquake that affected Prambanan damaged Plaosan.
Excavations in the area have uncovered significant artefacts.

See also

Borobudur
Mendut
Pawon
Candi of Indonesia
List of Buddhist temples

References

External links
  In Praise of Candi Plaosan by Mark Long gives much detail
 Official site

Buddhist temples in Indonesia
Cultural Properties of Indonesia in Central Java
Mataram Kingdom
Prambanan
Religious buildings and structures in Central Java
9th-century Buddhist temples